Leionema coxii is a shrub species that is endemic to southern New South Wales, Australia. It has an upright habit, dark green, narrow leaves and clusters of white flowers in spring.

Description
The inflorescence  is a corymb consisting of 10-30 flowers at the end of  flattened more or less smooth branches.

Taxonomy and naming
The species was first formally described in  1884 by Ferdinand von Mueller who gave it the name Eriostemon coxii and the description was published in The Australasian Chemist and Druggist. In 1998 Paul G. Wilson changed the name to Leionema coxii and the description was published in the journal Nuytsia. The specific epithet (coxii) honours James Charles Cox a medical practitioner of Sydney for promoting "scientific objects in the neighbouring elder colony".

Distribution and habitat
This species grows in forests, brushland, near water courses and ridges from Morton National Park to the Tuross River area, mostly in the Budawang Range in southern New South Wales.

References

coxii
Sapindales of Australia
Flora of New South Wales
Taxa named by Ferdinand von Mueller